Susan Cope (born 1947), is a female retired swimmer who competed for England.

Swimming career
She represented England and won a bronze medal in the 440 yards freestyle relay, at the 1966 British Empire and Commonwealth Games in Kingston, Jamaica.

References

1947 births
English female swimmers
Commonwealth Games medallists in swimming
Commonwealth Games bronze medallists for England
Swimmers at the 1966 British Empire and Commonwealth Games
Living people
Medallists at the 1966 British Empire and Commonwealth Games